Kivimäe railway station is a railway station in the Nõmme district  of Tallinn, Estonia. The station serves the Kivimäe sub-district which has approximately 4800 residents.

It is located approximately 10 kilometers (6,2 mi) southwest from the Baltic station (Estonian: Balti jaam) which is the main railway station of Tallinn, near the Baltic Sea. The Kivimäe railway station is located between Hiiu and Pääsküla railway stations of Tallinn-Keila railway. The station was opened on November 3rd 1924.

There are two platforms along the two-track railway, 133 and 146 meters long. Elron's electric trains from Tallinn to Keila, Paldiski, Turba and Klooga-Rand stop at Kivimäe station. The station belongs to the Zone I, within which traffic is free for Tallinners.

There is a possibility to transfer to bus line 27 northwest of the railway station on Pärnu maantee.

In 1937 a station building was completed from silicate bricks according to the project of Hendrik Otlood, which in 1997 was declared a cultural monument.

Ticket sales in the station building ended in 1998.:et:Kivim%C3%A4e raudteepeatus

In 2020, there were approximately 58 train departures per day at Kivimäe railway station towards Tallinn city center.

See also
 List of railway stations in Estonia
 Rail transport in Estonia

References

External links

 Official website of Eesti Raudtee (EVR) – the national railway infrastructure company of Estonia  responsible for maintenance and traffic control of most of the Estonian railway network
 Official website of Elron – the national passenger train operating company of Estonia operating all domestic passenger train services

Railway stations in Estonia
Buildings and structures in Tallinn
Transport in Tallinn
Railway stations opened in 1924